Musa Kazanov (born 27 November 1936) is a Bulgarian wrestler. He competed in the men's freestyle welterweight at the 1960 Summer Olympics.

References

External links
 

1936 births
Living people
Bulgarian male sport wrestlers
Olympic wrestlers of Bulgaria
Wrestlers at the 1960 Summer Olympics
People from Razgrad